European Standards (abbreviated EN, from the German name  ("European Norm")) are technical standards which have been ratified by one of the three European standards organizations: European Committee for Standardization (CEN), European Committee for Electrotechnical Standardization (CENELEC), or European Telecommunications Standards Institute (ETSI). All ENs are designed and created by all interested parties through a transparent, open, and consensual process.

European Standards are a key component of the Single European Market. They are crucial in facilitating trade and have high visibility among manufacturers inside and outside the European territory. A standard represents a model specification, a technical solution against which a market can trade.

European Standards must be transposed into a national standard in all EU member states. This guarantees that a manufacturer has easier access to the market of all these European countries when applying European Standards. Member countries must also withdraw any conflicting national standard: the EN supersedes any national standard.

Numbering and naming 

Number assignment starts with EN 1 (Flued oil stoves with vaporizing burners). The following predefined number ranges are an exception.

Since standards are updated as needed (they are reviewed for currency approximately every five years), it is useful to specify a version. The year of origin is added after the standard, separated by a colon, example: EN 50126:1999.

In addition to the EN standards mentioned, there are also the EN ISO standards with the numbers ISO 1 to 59999 and the EN IEC standards from IEC 60000 to 79999, as well as EN standards outside the defined number ranges.

When an EN is adopted by a national standards body into the national body of standards, it is given the status of a national standard (e.g. German Institute for Standardisation (DIN), Austrian Standards International (ÖNORM), Austrian Standards International (SN)). The name is then prefixed by the country-specific abbreviation (e.g. ÖNORM EN ...), and the number of the European standard is usually adopted, e.g. DIN EN ISO 2338:1998 or ÖNORM EN ISO 9001:2000.

Where to find European standards 
European Standards can be found on the respective Catalogues of the European Standardization Bodies (CEN, CENELEC and ETSI). The national adoptions of the European Standards can be found on the respective catalogues of the National Standardization Bodies.

CEN is one of three European Standardization Organizations and develops standards for numerous kinds of products, materials, services and processes. Some sectors covered by CEN include transport equipment and services, chemicals, construction, consumer products, defence and security, energy, food and feed, health and safety, healthcare, digital sector, machinery or services. CEN adopts ISO standards in Europe, through the prefix “EN ISO” (see also Vienna Agreement). CEN standards are commonly referred to in European legislation and policies, like in the case of CENELEC or ETSI European Standards.

See also
 List of EN standards
 Eurocodes

References